President of China may refer to:
 President of the People's Republic of China, ceremonial figurehead post of Mainland China
 President of the Republic of China, head of state and commander-in-chief of Taiwan

See also
 List of presidents of China
 Premier of China (disambiguation)
 Chairman of China (disambiguation)
 Paramount leader